Gotlands Tidningar (Swedish: Gotland’s Newspapers) is a Swedish local newspaper based in Visby, Sweden.

Profile
Gotlands Tidningar was established in 1966 when two papers, Gotlänningen and Gotlands Folkblad, formed a joint operating company to publish them as two editions under the same name. The paper has its headquarters in Visby and is published six days per week. Since 1999 the paper has been owned by Norrköpings Tidningar Media AB. The publisher is Gotlands Förenade Tidningstryckerier. The paper is published in tabloid format.

In 2002 Gotlands Tidningar sold 12,800 copies.

References

External links
 

1966 establishments in Sweden
Mass media in Visby
Daily newspapers published in Sweden
Publications established in 1966
Swedish-language newspapers